Bayreuth Hauptbahnhof is the main railway station in the German town of Bayreuth, in northern Bavaria.

Overview
Railway lines run north to Neuenmarkt-Wirsberg, and from there to Bamberg and over the Schiefe Ebene to Hof, east to Weidenberg, southeast to Weiden and south  to Schnabelwaid with connections to Nuremberg on the Pegnitz Valley Railway. The lines around Bayreuth are all single-tracked and non-electrified.

Train services
Due to the fact that all four railway lines are single-track and non-electrified, Bayreuth is currently only served by regional rail services.  From December 2007 until December 2013, the Franken-Sachsen-Express provided a direct connection from Nuremberg to Dresden.  The technology used for this was the Class 612 diesel multiple set.  After the electrification of the railway between Plauen and Hof in 2013, the Franken-Sachsen-Express required a transfer in Hof and had a longer travel time due to the use of non-tilting electric trains.  Later that year, the FSX was rerouted through Marktredwitz for a fully electrified railway.

Regional Rail Services
Regional routes serving Bayreuth are operated by DB Regio and the private company agilis.  Since 2014, regional rail services in Bayreuth have belonged to the Integrated Transport Association of Greater Nuremberg (VGN, for Verkehrsverbund Großraum Nürnberg).  There are Regional-Express links via Lichtenfels to Bamberg and Würzburg, and via Lichtenfels and Kronach to Saalfeld.

Beginning on 23 May 1992, tilting diesel multiple units of Class 610 have worked the railway through the Pegnitz valley from Nuremberg to Bayreuth.  These were bought by the former Deutsche Bundesbahn specifically for the winding railway.  These trains proved quite reliable and reduced the travel time significantly.  Today, DB Regio uses the Class 612 DMUs exclusively, and agilis operates the Stadler Regio-Shuttle RS1.

Gallery

Literature
Robert Zintl: Bayreuth und die Eisenbahn. Gondrom, Bindlach 1992,

See also
List of railway stations in Bavaria

References

External links

Railway stations in Bavaria
Buildings and structures in Bayreuth
Railway stations in Germany opened in 1853